The Buttons are two small islands lying  northwest of Galindez Island in the Argentine Islands, Wilhelm Archipelago. They were charted and named in 1935 by the British Graham Land Expedition under John Rymill.

References 

Islands of the Wilhelm Archipelago